Bujin (also Romanized as Būjīn) is a village in Darbandrud Rural District, in the Central District of Asadabad County, Hamadan Province, Iran. At the 2006 census, its population was 447, in 99 families.

References 

Populated places in Asadabad County